Wolffia globosa is a species of flowering plant known by the common names Asian watermeal and duckweed. It is native to Asia and is found in parts of the Americas and Africa, where it is an introduced species. It grows in mats on the surface of calm, freshwater bodies, such as ponds, lakes, and marshes. It is a very tiny, oval-shaped plant with no leaves, stems, or roots. The body of the plant, a transparent green frond, is less than a millimeter wide. In one human experiment, processed W. globosa was reported to provide dietary protein and vitamin B12.

Known in Thai as Pham (ผํา), it is a popular item in Thai cuisine, especially in Isan.

References

External links
Jepson Manual (1993)

Lemnoideae
Flora of tropical Asia
Flora of China
Flora of Japan
Flora of Taiwan